Martin Perry Hottel (25 January 1904 – 30 May 1981), was a decorated submarine commander during World War II who reached the rank of rear admiral in the United States Navy.

Martin Perry Hottel was born to Coast Guard Rear Admiral James F. Hottel and Ruby Mallory Hottel (née Perry) in Washington D.C., 25 January 1904. Hottel received his appointment to the United States Naval Academy from Washington State and was admitted 6 July 1923. Ensign Hottel was promoted to lieutenant (junior grade) on 2 June 1930. LTJG Hottel then completed courses in submarine, torpedo, and chemical warfare, and was subsequently ordered to Submarine Division 3. LTJG Hottel's first submarine assignment was on board the S-10. In 1933 LTJG Hottel was list as being fully qualified in submarines, and by 1934 was qualified to command submarines. The rolling year Hottel was assigned to the Office of the Chief of Naval Operations and completed postgraduate course in general line duties. On 30 June 1936, LTJG Hottel was promoted to Lieutenant and assigned to the USS S-20 (SS-125). In 1936, LT Hottel took command of his first submarine, the USS R-4 (SS-81). In 1939, LT Hottel was listed as being assigned to the submarine base Coco Solo in  Cativá, Panama. When Pearl Harbor was attacked by the Japanese, the USS Cuttlefish was at Mare Island Naval Shipyard receiving an overhaul.

References

1904 births
1981 deaths
United States Navy rear admirals (lower half)
United States Naval Academy alumni